Panama competed at the 2012 Summer Olympics in London, from 27 July to 12 August 2012. This was the nation's sixteenth appearance at the Olympics since its debut in 1920. Panama did not compete on four occasions, including the 1980 Summer Olympics in Moscow, because of its partial support of the United States boycott.

Comité Olímpico de Panamá sent 8 athletes, 6 men and 2 women, to compete in 5 sports, tying its record with Montreal in 1976, and with Los Angeles in 1984. Two of their athletes competed at their second consecutive Olympics, including breaststroke swimmer Edgar Crespo. Long jumper Irving Saladino, who won Panama's first ever Olympic gold medal in Beijing, became the nation's first male flag bearer at the opening ceremony since 1992.

Panama, however, failed to win a single Olympic medal for the first time since 2004, following the nation's poor athletic performance at these Games, and Saladino's unsuccessful attempt in the qualifying rounds of his event.

Athletics

Panamanian athletes have so far achieved qualifying standards in the following athletics events (up to a maximum of 3 athletes in each event at the 'A' Standard, and 1 at the 'B' Standard):

Key
 Note – Ranks given for track events are within the athlete's heat only
 Q = Qualified for the next round
 q = Qualified for the next round as a fastest loser or, in field events, by position without achieving the qualifying target
 NR = National record
 N/A = Round not applicable for the event
 Bye = Athlete not required to compete in round

Men
Track & road events

Field events

Women
Track & road events

Boxing

Men

Judo

Panama has qualified 1 judoka.

Swimming

Panamanian swimmers have so far achieved qualifying standards in the following events (up to a maximum of 2 swimmers in each event at the Olympic Qualifying Time (OQT), and potentially 1 at the Olympic Selection Time (OST)): Panama also has gained a "Universality place" from the FINA.

Men

Taekwondo

Panama was given a wild card entrant.

See also
Panama at the 2011 Pan American Games

References

External links

Nations at the 2012 Summer Olympics
2012
2012 in Panamanian sport